Hickory Stump Hollow is a valley in southeastern Ozark County in the Ozarks of southern Missouri. The valley headwaters lie just south of U.S. Route 160 east of Tecumseh. The stream enters Bridges Creek about one-quarter mile east of the waters of Norfork Lake.

Hickory Stump Hollow was named for the fact stumps of hickory trees were a common sight in the area.

References

Valleys of Ozark County, Missouri
Valleys of Missouri